The 1998 Arab Club Champions Cup was played in Saudi Arabia in the city of Jeddah. WA Tlemcen won the championship for the first time beating in the final Al Shabab.

Participants

Preliminary round

Zone 1 (Gulf Area)
Qualification from GCC Champions League held in Muscat in February 1998.

Al-Hilal withdrew. West Riffa SC & Al-Wasl advanced to the final tournament.

Zone 2 (Red Sea)
Qualifying tournament held in Cairo. Al-Merrikh & Al-Wehda withdrew.

Al Ahly qualified but withdrew, Al Shabab replaced it and advanced to the final tournament.

Zone 3 (North Africa)
CA Bizertin withdrew.

WA Tlemcen & Al Tahaddy advanced automatically to the final tournament.

Zone 4 (East Region)
Tishreen, Lebanon & Palestine representative teams withdrew.

Al-Wehdat advanced automatically to the final tournament.

Final tournament

Group stage
The eight teams were drawn into two groups of four. Each group was played on one leg basis. The winners and runners-up of each group advanced to the semi-finals.

Group A

Group B

Knockout stage

Semi-finals

Final

Winners

Statistics

Goalscorers

Awards
Highest Scorer
 Hamzah Idris

Man of the Competition
 Abdullah Al-Sheehan

Best Goalkeeper
 Hichem Mezaïr

Fair Play team of the tournament
Al Shabab

References

External links
13th Arab Club Champions Cup 1998 – rsssf.com

1998
1998 in African football
1998 in Asian football
International association football competitions hosted by Saudi Arabia